The Portuguese local elections of 1985 took place on 15 December. They were the fourth local elections in Portugal since the democratic revolution of 1974 introduced the concept of democratic local power. The elections took place just nine weeks after the 1985 legislative election and just one month before the 1986 Presidential elections.

The elections consisted of three separate elections in the 305 Portuguese municipalities that existed at the time, the election for the Municipal Chambers, whose winner is elected mayor, another election for the Municipal Assembly and a last one for the lower-level Parish Assembly, whose winner is elected parish president, this last was held separately in the more than 4,000 parishes around the country. This election was the first to grant a 4-years term, instead of the former 3 years. The number of members of the Municipal Assemblies and Parish Assemblies was greatly reduced in comparison with the former election.

For the first time, the Social Democratic Party achieved the majority of the voting by itself, since the coalition with the Democratic and Social Center, the Democratic Alliance, that achieved good results in 1979 and 1982 had been disbanded. Despite finishing second and losing almost 4% of the voting, the Socialist Party lost only 4 of the former 83 mayors plus the presidency achieved in coalition with the Leftwing Union for the Socialist Democracy.

The Democratic and Social Center, this time participating alone in every election, after the end of the Democratic Alliance, continued its electoral decline, gathering only 10% of the voting. Despite keeping the same number of mayors achieved in 1982, in the municipalities where it ran alone, 27, the party lost 49 presidencies achieved in coalition with the Social Democrats.

The Portuguese Communist Party and the Portuguese Democratic Movement, united in the United People Alliance, lost 1% of the voting in comparison with the election of 1982 and lost 8 mayors, gathering only 47 presidencies. However, despite losing only 1% of the voting in the elections to Municipal Assemblies, the coalition lost almost 700 assembly members, decreasing its representation to 1062 members due to the overall reduction of mandates.

The newly founded Democratic Renewal Party, achieved almost 5% of the voting and the presidency of 3 municipalities. In the elections to Municipal Assemblies it gathered almost 6% of the voting and 270 Assembly members, being the great surprise of the election.

Parties 
The main political forces involved in the election were:

 United People Alliance (APU)
 Democratic and Social Center (CDS) 
 Democratic Renewal Party (PRD)
 Socialist Party (PS)
 Social Democratic Party (PSD)

Results

Municipal Councils

National summary of votes and seats

|-
! rowspan="2" colspan=2 style="background-color:#E9E9E9" align=left|Parties
! rowspan="2" style="background-color:#E9E9E9" align=right|Votes
! rowspan="2" style="background-color:#E9E9E9" align=right|%
! rowspan="2" style="background-color:#E9E9E9" align=right|Candidacies
! colspan="2" style="background-color:#E9E9E9" align="center"|Councillors
! colspan="2" style="background-color:#E9E9E9" align="center"|Mayors
|- style="background-color:#E9E9E9"
! style="background-color:#E9E9E9" align="center"|Total
! style="background-color:#E9E9E9" align="center"|±
! style="background-color:#E9E9E9" align="center"|Total
! style="background-color:#E9E9E9" align="center"|±
|-
| 
|align=right| 1,633,247
|align=right| 34.19
|align=right|
|align=right| 819
|align=right| 380 
|align=right| 149
|align=right| 61
|-
| 
|align=right| 1,318,287 	  	
|align=right| 27.60
|align=right| 
|align=right| 574
|align=right|45
|align=right| 79
|align=right|4
|-
| 
|align=right| 935,897 	
|align=right| 19.59
|align=right| 
|align=right| 303
|align=right|13
|align=right| 47
|align=right|8
|-
| 
|align=right| 466,965  	  	
|align=right| 9.78
|align=right| 
|align=right| 222
|align=right|37
|align=right| 27
|align=right|0
|-
| 
|align=right| 224,161 	
|align=right| 4.69
|align=right| 
|align=right| 49
|align=right|—
|align=right| 3
|align=right|—
|-
|style="width: 10px" bgcolor=#E2062C align="center" | 
|align=left|People's Democratic Union
|align=right| 28,701  	 	
|align=right| 0.60
|align=right| 
|align=right| 3
|align=right| 0
|align=right| 0
|align=right|0
|-
| 
|align=right| 23,968	
|align=right| 0.50
|align=right| 
|align=right| 3 
|align=right|2
|align=right| 0
|align=right|1
|-
| 
|align=right| 10,967  	 	  	
|align=right| 0.23
|align=right| 
|align=right| 0
|align=right|0
|align=right| 0
|align=right|0
|-
| 
|align=right| 7,910 	   	 	 	
|align=right| 0.17
|align=right|
|align=right| 2 
|align=right|0
|align=right| 0
|align=right|0
|-
| 
|align=right| 2,324 	
|align=right| 0.05
|align=right|
|align=right| 0 
|align=right|0
|align=right| 0
|align=right|0
|-
|colspan=2 align=left style="background-color:#E9E9E9"|Total valid
|width="65" align="right" style="background-color:#E9E9E9"|4,631,497
|width="40" align="right" style="background-color:#E9E9E9"|96.97
|width="40" align="right" style="background-color:#E9E9E9"|—
|width="45" align="right" style="background-color:#E9E9E9"|1,975
|width="45" align="right" style="background-color:#E9E9E9"|66
|width="45" align="right" style="background-color:#E9E9E9"|305
|width="45" align="right" style="background-color:#E9E9E9"|0
|-
|colspan=2|Blank ballots
|73,784||1.54||colspan=6 rowspan=4|
|-
|colspan=2|Invalid ballots
|71,126||1.49
|-
|colspan=2 align=left style="background-color:#E9E9E9"|Total
|width="65" align="right" style="background-color:#E9E9E9"|4,776,407
|width="40" align="right" style="background-color:#E9E9E9"|100.00
|-
|colspan=2|Registered voters/turnout
||7,578,622||63.02
|}

Municipality map

City control
The following table lists party control in all district capitals, as well as in municipalities above 100,000 inhabitants. Population estimates from the 1981 Census.

Municipal Assemblies

National summary of votes and seats

|-
! rowspan="2" colspan=2 style="background-color:#E9E9E9" align=left|Parties
! rowspan="2" style="background-color:#E9E9E9" align=right|Votes
! rowspan="2" style="background-color:#E9E9E9" align=right|%
! rowspan="2" style="background-color:#E9E9E9" align=right|Candidacies
! colspan="2" style="background-color:#E9E9E9" align="center"|Mandates
|- style="background-color:#E9E9E9"
! style="background-color:#E9E9E9" align="center"|Total
! style="background-color:#E9E9E9" align="center"|±
|-
| 
|align=right| 1,391,500 		
|align=right| 29.59
|align=right|
|align=right| 2,509
|align=right| 361
|-
| 
|align=right| 1,142,381  	
|align=right| 24.30
|align=right|
|align=right| 1,796
|align=right| 1,386
|- 
| 
|align=right| 953,935  	
|align=right| 20.29
|align=right| 
|align=right| 1,056
|align=right|707
|-
| 
|align=right| 761,855
|align=right| 16.20
|align=right| 
|align=right| 1,015
|align=right|12
|-
| 
|align=right| 245,830 	
|align=right| 5.22
|align=right| 
|align=right| 273
|align=right|—
|-
|style="width: 10px" bgcolor=#E2062C align="center" | 
|align=left|People's Democratic Union
|align=right| 31,899 	  	
|align=right| 0.68
|align=right|
|align=right| 14
|align=right|7
|-
| 
|align=right| 15,949  	
|align=right| 0.34
|align=right|
|align=right|7 
|align=right|21
|-
| 
|align=right| 6,396 	  	 	   	  	  	
|align=right| 0.14
|align=right|
|align=right| 0
|align=right|0
|-
| 
|align=right| 4,002 	 
|align=right| 0.09
|align=right| 
|align=right| 2
|align=right|0
|-
| 
|align=right| 783 	  	
|align=right| 0.02
|align=right| 
|align=right|0
|align=right|—
|-
| 
|align=right| 254	
|align=right| 0.00
|align=right|
|align=right| 0
|align=right|0
|-
|colspan=2 align=left style="background-color:#E9E9E9"|Total valid
|width="65" align="right" style="background-color:#E9E9E9"|4,543,206
|width="40" align="right" style="background-color:#E9E9E9"|96.62
|width="40" align="right" style="background-color:#E9E9E9"|—
|width="45" align="right" style="background-color:#E9E9E9"|6,672
|width="45" align="right" style="background-color:#E9E9E9"|3,225
|-
|colspan=2|Blank ballots
|88,935||1.89||colspan=6 rowspan=4|
|-
|colspan=2|Invalid ballots
|69,854||1.48
|-
|colspan=2 align=left style="background-color:#E9E9E9"|Total
|width="65" align="right" style="background-color:#E9E9E9"|4,701,995
|width="40" align="right" style="background-color:#E9E9E9"|100.00
|-
|colspan=2|Registered voters/turnout
||7,444,150||63.16
|}

Parish Assemblies

National summary of votes and seats

|-
! rowspan="2" colspan=2 style="background-color:#E9E9E9" align=left|Parties
! rowspan="2" style="background-color:#E9E9E9" align=right|Votes
! rowspan="2" style="background-color:#E9E9E9" align=right|%
! rowspan="2" style="background-color:#E9E9E9" align=right|Candidacies
! colspan="2" style="background-color:#E9E9E9" align="center"|Mandates
! colspan="2" style="background-color:#E9E9E9" align="center"|Presidents
|- style="background-color:#E9E9E9"
! style="background-color:#E9E9E9" align="center"|Total
! style="background-color:#E9E9E9" align="center"|±
! style="background-color:#E9E9E9" align="center"|Total
! style="background-color:#E9E9E9" align="center"|±
|-
| 
|align=right| 1,584,427  	  	
|align=right| 32.85
|align=right| 
|align=right| 13,118 
|align=right| 3,619
|align=right|
|align=right|
|-
| 
|align=right| 1,303,425 	
|align=right| 27.02
|align=right| 
|align=right| 9,039
|align=right|3,764
|align=right|
|align=right| 
|-
| 
|align=right| 993,767	   	 	
|align=right| 20.60
|align=right| 
|align=right| 3,676
|align=right|1,321
|align=right|
|align=right| 
|-
| 
|align=right| 507,499	
|align=right| 10.52
|align=right| 
|align=right| 4,531
|align=right| 306
|align=right| 
|align=right|
|-
| 
|align=right| 164,345
|align=right|3.41
|align=right| 
|align=right| 726
|align=right|—
|align=right|
|align=right|—
|-
|style="width: 8px" bgcolor=gray align="center" |
|align=left|Independents
|align=right| 67,601  	 
|align=right|1.40
|align=right| 
|align=right| 797
|align=right|241
|align=right|
|align=right|
|-
|style="width: 10px" bgcolor=#E2062C align="center" | 
|align=left|People's Democratic Union
|align=right| 28,572  	
|align=right| 0.59
|align=right| 
|align=right| 26
|align=right|4
|align=right|
|align=right|
|-
| 
|align=right| 4,153  	 	
|align=right| 0.09
|align=right|
|align=right| 0
|align=right|0
|align=right|
|align=right|
|-
| 
|align=right|2,585 	   	
|align=right| 0.05
|align=right| 
|align=right| 24 
|align=right|75
|align=right|
|align=right|
|-
| 
|align=right| 1,021  	
|align=right| 0.02
|align=right| 
|align=right| 4 
|align=right|4
|align=right|
|align=right| 
|-
| 
|align=right| 792
|align=right| 0.02
|align=right| 
|align=right| 0 
|align=right|0
|align=right|
|align=right|
|-
|colspan=2 align=left style="background-color:#E9E9E9"|Total valid
|width="65" align="right" style="background-color:#E9E9E9"|4,658,187
|width="40" align="right" style="background-color:#E9E9E9"|96.67
|width="40" align="right" style="background-color:#E9E9E9"|—
|width="45" align="right" style="background-color:#E9E9E9"|31,941
|width="45" align="right" style="background-color:#E9E9E9"|—
|width="45" align="right" style="background-color:#E9E9E9"| 
|width="45" align="right" style="background-color:#E9E9E9"|—
|-
|colspan=2|Blank ballots
|84,797||1.77||colspan=6 rowspan=4|
|-
|colspan=2|Invalid ballots
|80,766||1.67
|-
|colspan=2 align=left style="background-color:#E9E9E9"|Total
|width="65" align="right" style="background-color:#E9E9E9"|4,823,750
|width="40" align="right" style="background-color:#E9E9E9"|100.00
|-
|colspan=2|Registered voters/turnout
||7,652,786||63.52
|}

Maps

Notes

 The source of the voting data is the Portuguese Electoral Commission

Further Notes:

 United People Alliance (APU) was composed by the Portuguese Communist Party (PCP) and the Portuguese Democratic Movement (MDP/CDE).
 The number of candidacies expresses the number of municipalities or parishes in which the party or coalition presented lists.
 The number of mandates expresses the number of municipal deputies in the Municipal Assembly election and the number of parish deputies in the Parish Assembly election.
 The turnout varies because one may choose not to vote for all the organs.

See also
 Politics of Portugal
 List of political parties in Portugal
 Elections in Portugal

References

External links
 Portuguese Electoral Commission

1985
Local
December 1985 events in Europe